Ingrid Røstad Fløtten (born 1954) is a Norwegian judge and politician.  She served as the acting County Governor of Finnmark county from 31 August 1990 until 31 July 1993.

Ingrid Røstad Fløtten was born on 18 June 1954 in Norway.

Fløtten was a judge for the Vardø municipal court for many years.  Prior to 31 December 2004, she was the chairwoman for SEFO in Troms and Finnmark.  SEFO was the predecessor to the present-day Norwegian Bureau for the Investigation of Police Affairs.

In 2011, she was named the leader of the committee that was to review the weapons laws in Norway in response to the 2011 Norway attacks.

References

1954 births
Living people
Norwegian judges

County governors of Norway